Dirk Oberritter (born 10 July 1972) is a German former professional footballer.

A defender, Oberritter began his career with Dynamo Dresden, making his debut as a substitute for Dirk Zander in a 1–1 draw with 1. FC Saarbrücken in the Bundesliga in September 1992. He made one more appearance for Dynamo during the 1994–95 season, but was part of a mass exodus from Dynamo in the summer of 1995, after the club had been relegated to the Regionalliga Nordost.

He signed for Dynamo's Saxony rivals VfB Leipzig, but was back at Dynamo after only six months and one league appearance. He spent a further six years with the club, playing in the Regionalliga and the NOFV-Oberliga Süd, but his latter years were marred by injury. After brief spells with Stahl Riesa and FV Dresden 06, Oberritter's senior career ended, although he continued to play for SV Wesenitztal of the Bezirksliga.

References

External links

1972 births
Living people
German footballers
Association football defenders
Dynamo Dresden players
Dynamo Dresden II players
1. FC Lokomotive Leipzig players
Bundesliga players
2. Bundesliga players